Club Yaguez is a Puerto Rican soccer team that plays in Mayaguez.  They play in the Liga Nacional.

Liga Nacional
Won their first game 6-3 to Guayanilla Pumas.

Current squad

References

Sports in Mayagüez, Puerto Rico
Puerto Rico Soccer League 2nd Division
Football clubs in Puerto Rico
Liga Nacional de Fútbol de Puerto Rico teams